Minuscule 2174 (in the Gregory-Aland numbering), is a Greek minuscule manuscript of the New Testament, on parchment leaves. Paleographically it has been assigned to the 13th century. It has marginalia.

Description 

The codex contains a complete text of the four Gospels on 250 parchment leaves (size 17.2 cm by 12.6 cm). The text is written in one column per page, 24 lines per page (size of column 11 by 7.6 cm). The initial letters are in red.

There is also a division according to the smaller Ammonian Sections (in Mark 236 Sections - 16:19), (no references to the Eusebian Canons).

Kurt Aland did not place the Greek text of the codex in any Category.
According to the Claremont Profile Method it represents a textual cluster 1216 in Luke 1, Luke 10, and Luke 20. It creates a textual pair with 477, weak in Luke 1 and Luke 10. The manuscript is a fragmentary in Luke 1.

The Pericope Adulterae (John 7:53-8:11) was added by a later hand.

The manuscript is often cited in Nestle-Aland's editions of the Novum Testamentum Graece.

It is currently housed at the Russian National Library (Gr. 513), at Saint Petersburg.

See also 

 List of New Testament minuscules
 Biblical manuscript
 Textual criticism

References

Further reading 

 Kurt Treu, "Die Griechischen Handschriften des Neuen Testaments in der USSR; eine systematische Auswertung des Texthandschriften in Leningrad, Moskau, Kiev, Odessa, Tbilisi und Erevan", T & U 91 (Berlin: 1966), pp. 164–166.

Greek New Testament minuscules
13th-century biblical manuscripts